Ernesto Gallina (15 May 1924 – 16 May 2002) was an Italian prelate of the Catholic Church who worked in the diplomatic service of the Holy See.

Biography
Ernesto Gallina was born in Frosinone, Italy, on 15 May 1924. He was ordained a priest on 31 May 1947. 

To prepare for a career in the diplomatic service he entered the program of study at the Pontifical Ecclesiastical Academy in 1951.

On 16 July 1969, Pope Paul VI named him a titular archbishop and gave him three diplomatic posts: Apostolic Nuncio to Cameroon, Apostolic Pro-Nuncio to Gabon, and Apostolic Delegate to Central Africa.

He received his episcopal consecration on 10 August from Cardinal Jean-Marie Villot.

On 15 March 1971, Pope Paul appointed him Apostolic Pro-Nuncio to Iran.

From 4 January 1976 until he retired on 15 May 1999, he worked at the Secretariat of State in Rome. 

He died on 16 May 2002, at the age of 78.

References

External links
Catholic Hierarchy: Archbishop Ernesto Gallina 

1924 births
2002 deaths
20th-century Italian Roman Catholic titular archbishops
Apostolic Nuncios to Iran
Apostolic Nuncios to Cameroon
Apostolic Nuncios to Gabon
People from the Province of Frosinone
Italian expatriates in Iran
Italian expatriates in Cameroon
Italian expatriates in Gabon